The Roman Catholic Diocese of San Sebastián is a diocese located in the city of San Sebastián in the Ecclesiastical province of Pamplona y Tudela in Spain.

History
 2 November 1949: Established as Diocese of San Sebastián

Special churches

 Cathedral:
Cathedral of the Good Shepherd, San Sebastián
 Minor basilicas:
Basilica of Saint Ignatius of Loyola, Azpeitia
Basilica of Saint Mary of the Chorus, San Sebastián

Leadership
Jaime Font y Andreu (13 May 1950 – 13 Feb 1963 )
Lorenzo Bereciartúa y Balerdi (6 Aug 1963 – 23 Oct 1968 )
Jacinto Argaya Goicoechea (18 Nov 1968 – 16 Feb 1979 )
José María Setién Alberro (16 Feb 1979 – 13 Jan 2000 )
Juan María Uriarte Goiricelaya (13 Jan 2000 – 21 Nov 2009)
José Ignacio Munilla Aguirre (21 Nov 2009 – 2022)
Fernando Prado Ayuso (17 Dec 2022 – )

See also
Roman Catholicism in Spain

References

External links
 GCatholic.org 
 Catholic Hierarchy 
 Diocese website

Roman Catholic dioceses in Spain
Christian organizations established in 1949
Roman Catholic dioceses and prelatures established in the 20th century
1949 establishments in Spain